Nadarević is a Bosniak surname. Notable people with the surname include:

 Mustafa Nadarević (1943–2020), Bosnian and Croatian actor
 Safet Nadarević (born 1980), Bosnian footballer
 Enis Nadarević (born 1987), Bosnian footballer

Bosnian surnames